The SA Suns (formerly Southern Suns - prior to 2015)  are a women's field hockey team based in South Australia that competes in the Australian Hockey League (AHL).

References

Australian field hockey clubs
Women's field hockey teams in Australia
Sports teams in South Australia
Sporting clubs in Adelaide
Field hockey clubs established in 1993